The Mother/Daughter Experiment: Celebrity Edition is an American reality television series that premiered on March 1, 2016, on the Lifetime cable network. The show is about six mother/daughter pairs who try to repair their broken relationships and rebuild their bonds. With therapist Dr. Debbie Magids guiding them through explosive therapy and intense exercises.

Cast
 Natalie Nunn  former cast member of Bad Girls Club and Karen Nunn.
 Heidi Montag  former cast member of The Hills and Darlene Egelhoff.
 Kim Richards  former cast member of The Real Housewives of Beverly Hills and Kimberly Jackson.
 Shar Jackson  actress known for Moesha and Cassie Jackson.
 Courtney Stodden  former cast member of Couples Therapy and Krista Keller.
 Jessica Canseco  former cast member of Hollywood Exes and Josie Canseco.

Episodes

Controversies
Shortly after its premiere, Krista Keller, the mother of Courtney Stodden, threatened to sue the Lifetime network over her portrayal on the show.

References

External links
 

2010s American reality television series
2016 American television series debuts
English-language television shows
Television shows set in Los Angeles
Lifetime (TV network) original programming